Lynda Suzanne Robinson (born July 6, 1951 in Amarillo, Texas) is an American writer, author of romance (under the name Suzanne Robinson) and mystery novels (under the name Lynda S. Robinson). She is best known for her series of historical whodunnits set in Ancient Egypt during the reign of Tutankhamun and featuring Lord Meren, "the Eyes and Ears of Pharaoh". She lives in Texas with her husband and has a doctorate in anthropology from the University of Texas at Austin.

Biography
Lynda Suzanne Robinson was born on July 6, 1951 in Amarillo Texas. She has a doctoral degree in anthropology with a specialty in the subdiscipline of archaeology from the University of Texas at Austin. She has done field work in both the Middle East and the United States, as well as museum research and work in exhibits of ancient art.

Robinson completed her education only to discover that she had "burned out" on academia. She was encouraged by her husband to explore a writing career, sat down at her computer to write five pages of a story, and knew that writing fiction was what she wanted to do for the rest of her life. Now she uses the knowledge gained in graduate school and fieldwork to write novels the authenticity of which has been acclaimed by critics and readers alike.

Her first published novel, "Heart of the Falcon", was a historical romance set in ancient Egypt with a heavy dose of suspense and mystery. It later became the model for a mystery series set in ancient Egypt-the Lord Meren series. As Suzanne Robinson has written twelve historical romances of various settings and time periods-from ancient Egypt to the Elizabethan and Victorian periods. Published by Bantam Books, her novels are praised for their complex, intriguing plots, unique characterization and historical authenticity. Her latest undertaking is a novel of romantic suspense set in civil war Washington D.C. Robinson has been called "an author of star quality" and "spectacularly talented".

As Lynda S. Robinson is an author of critically acclaimed historical novels-the Lord Meren series of ancient Egyptian mysteries. Her first mystery was published by Walker & Company (February, '94). Set in the reign of the pharaoh Tutankhamun, Murder in the Place of Anubis received a starred review from Publishers Weekly (1994). Called an "exceptional debut", "riveting" and "a memorable tale", Murder in the Place of Anubis also received excellent response from Kirkus Reviews, Bookline, and Mystery News, to name a few. Her second and third novels, Murder at the God's Gate (1995) and Murder at the Feast of Rejoicing (1996) again received rave reviews from Publishers Weekly and The New York Times Book Review, as well as major national newspapers. The Lord Meren series is published in paperback by Ballantine Books. The first book is now in a fourth paperback printing. Robinson is excited at the enthusiastic response to her novels and is please that the fourth Lord Meren novel-Eater of Souls-gained her fourth starred review in a row from Publishers Weekly. Again acclaimed by The New York Times Book Review for Eater of Souls, she has continued the successful series with Drinker of Blood and Slayer of Gods. Robinson is especially gratified that her mysteries have won the acclaim of Egyptologists for their accuracy and authentic portrayal of life in ancient Egypt. Her latest Lord Meren story is "Heretic's Dagger", a short story in The Mammoth Book of Egyptian Whodunnits, released in October 2002.

Robinson lives in Texas in the south central hill country with her husband.

Bibliography

As Suzanne Robinson
Sorted by publication

Single novels
Heart of the Falcon 1990/May
Lady Gallant 1992/Fev
Lady Hellefire 1992/Jun
Lady Defiant 1993/Jan
Lady Dangerous 1994/Mar
Lord of the Dragon 1995/Sep
The Engagement 1996/Jun
The Rescue 1998/Fev
The Treasure 1999/Apr
Just Before Midnight 2000/Fev
The Legend 2001/Mar
Never Trust a Lady 2003/Aug

St. John Family Series
Lady Valiant 1993/Jun
Lord of Enchantment 1995/Jan

Anthologies in collaboration
"The unwanted bride" in WHEN YOU WISH 1997/Nov (with Jane Feather, Sharon & Tom Curtis, Patricia Coughlin, Elizabeth Elliott, Patricia Potter)

As Lynda S. Robinson

The Lord Meren series
Murder in the Place of Anubis (1994, ; 2021)
Murder at the God's Gate (1995, ; 2021)
Murder at the Feast of Rejoicing (1996, ; 2021)
Eater of Souls (1997, ; 2021)
Drinker of Blood (1998, ; 2021)
Slayer of Gods (2001, ; 2021)

See also

P. C. Doherty
Lauren Haney

References and sources

External links
Lynda S. Robinson – Lord Meren Mysteries Homepage and Suzanne Robinson Book List
Lynda S. Robinson and Suzanne Robinson in FantasticFiction

1951 births
Living people
20th-century American novelists
21st-century American novelists
American women novelists
American historical novelists
American mystery writers
American romantic fiction writers
People from Amarillo, Texas
Novelists from Texas
Writers of historical mysteries
Women romantic fiction writers
Women mystery writers
20th-century American women writers
21st-century American women writers
Women historical novelists